Heterostrophus is an extinct genus of ray-finned fish belonging to the family Dapediidae. It lived from the Callovian stage of the Middle Jurassic epoch to the early Tithonian stage of the Late Jurassic epoch.

References

Dapediidae
Prehistoric ray-finned fish genera
Middle Jurassic fish
Late Jurassic fish